Moroccan Roll (1977) is the second studio album by British jazz fusion group Brand X. The title is a pun referring to this being their second album: "more rock and roll", however, Moroccan Roll is not a step toward the rock & roll side of the fusion equation, but rather an experiment with Eastern sounds and softer textures. The album is mostly instrumental. "Sun in the Night" contains vocals sung by Brand X drummer Phil Collins in Sanskrit. "Disco Suicide" and "Maybe I'll Lend You Mine After All" also contain vocals, although they are wordless.

Track listing

Side one
"Sun in the Night" (John Goodsall) – 4:25
"Why Should I Lend You Mine (When You've Broken Yours Off Already)..." (Phil Collins) – 11:16
"...Maybe I'll Lend You Mine after All" (Collins) – 2:10
"Hate Zone" (Goodsall) – 4:41
"Collapsar" (Robin Lumley) – 1:33

Side two
"Disco Suicide" (Lumley) – 7:55
"Orbits" (Percy Jones) – 1:38
"Malaga Virgen" (Jones) – 8:28
"Macrocosm" (Goodsall) – 7:24

Personnel
Based on the album credits of original vinyl release.
 John Goodsall – guitars, sitar (1), echo, backing vocals
 Robin Lumley – Fender Rhodes electric piano, acoustic piano, Minimoog, ARP Odyssey, string synthesizer, Clavinet, Pulsar, echo, backing vocals, autoharp (5)
 Percy Jones – Fender bass, autoharp (7), marimba (8)
 Phil Collins – drums, lead vocals, acoustic piano (3)
 Morris Pert – percussion

Production
 Produced by Dennis MacKay
 Engineered and mixed by 'Perdurabo' Stephen W. Tayler
 Tape op: Chris Tsangarides
 Mastered by Ray Staff
 Album artwork by Hipgnosis

Charts

References

External links
 

1977 albums
Albums with cover art by Hipgnosis
Brand X albums
Charisma Records albums
Passport Records albums
Albums recorded at Trident Studios